San Salvatore Monferrato is a comune (municipality) in the Province of Alessandria in the Italian region Piedmont, located about  east of Turin and about  northwest of Alessandria.

Main sights
The tower of the Paleologi was erected for Theodore II, Marquess of Montferrat.

Other sights include the 16th century churches of San Martino e San Siro. the communal cemetery of the town is home to the grave of Paolo Provera, surnamed Tantasà, an example of outsider art.

People
Iginio Ugo Tarchetti (1839–1869), a novelist, also poet and journalist, and part of the Milanese Scapigliatura.
Paolo Provera (Tantasà) (1850–1930), an outsider artist.
Eugenio "Gene" Guglielmi (1947–), a beat folksinger.

References

 

Cities and towns in Piedmont